This is the discography for Dutch electronic musician Don Diablo.

Albums

Studio albums

Compilation albums

Remix albums

Extended plays

Singles

Soundtracks and theme songs
2008 "Life is a Festival" (Radeloos Soundtrack)
2012: "Cell" (Soundtrack Bellicher: Cel) 
2013: "Edge of the Earth" (Theme from The New Wilderness)
2013: "Origins" (the official title track of Batman: Arkham Origins)
2017: "Echoes" (Theme from Kill Switch)
2020: "Invincible" (Theme from AFK Arena)

Remixes
Remixes adapted from Don Diablo's SoundCloud page.

References 

Discographies of Dutch artists
Electronic music discographies